Charlestown is a city located within Charlestown Township, in Clark County, Indiana, United States. The population was 7,775 at the 2020 census.

History

It was established one mile (1.6 km) northeast of Springville, and was responsible for Springville's demise.

Milling was important to the town, as the first mill was built in the area, on Fourteen Mile Creek, in 1804. This mill would be abandoned when John Work built a mill by use of a tunnel in 1814. Today, that mill is part of the Tunnel Mill Scout Reservation.

From 1811 to 1878 Charlestown was the county seat of Clark County, but as Jeffersonville had surpassed it economically, the county seat reverted to Jeffersonville in 1878.

In 1818 the first Grand Lodge of Free & Accepted Masons in Indiana met in Charlestown, due to Jonathan Jennings' influence.

In 1940 the population of Charlestown was 900, but it swelled to 13,400 due to the building and operation of the Indiana Army Ammunition Plant (INAAP). This created a housing problem, as chicken, wood, and wash houses had to house all the new residents who flocked to the area for the jobs created by the INAAP. Additional problems caused by the rapid influx of new residents were improper sanitation at restaurants, inefficient sewers, gambling, panhandling, and diseases such as typhoid and malaria.

In 2014 the city announced they would be applying for a grant to redevelop Pleasant Ridge Subdivision, an impoverished area within the city. Some residents of the Pleasant Ridge Subdivision formed an association to fight against demolishing their homes via eminent domain.  The City Council did not call for a vote on the issue and the grant issue failed. Starting in 2016 the city was accused of using excessive fines against homeowners in the subdivision in order to force them to sell to a private developer.

Geography
Charlestown is located at  (38.451984, -85.667224).

Demographics

2020 Census 
As of the census of 2020, there were 7,775 people and  3,193 households residing in the city. The racial makeup of the city was 89.1% White, 1.8% African American, 1.0% Native American, 0.5% Asian, and 2.1% from two or more races. Hispanic or Latino of any race were 4.2% of the population.

2010 census
As of the census of 2010, there were 7,585 people, 2,884 households, and 2,034 families residing in the city. The racial makeup of the city was 89.9% White, 2.1% African American, 0.3% Native American, 0.3% Asian, 5.3% from other races, and 2.1% from two or more races. Hispanic or Latino of any race were 8.3% of the population.

There were 2,884 households, of which 39.7% had children under the age of 18 living with them, 46.7% were married couples living together, 17.9% had a female householder with no husband present, 5.9% had a male householder with no wife present, and 29.5% were non-families. 24.3% of all households were made up of individuals, and 9.4% had someone living alone who was 65 years of age or older. The average household size was 2.63 and the average family size was 3.09.

The median age in the city was 35.2 years. 28.4% of residents were under the age of 18; 8.8% were between the ages of 18 and 24; 27.5% were from 25 to 44; 24.2% were from 45 to 64; and 11.2% were 65 years of age or older. The gender makeup of the city was 47.5% male and 52.5% female.

2000 census
As of the census of 2000, there were 5,993 people, 2,341 households, and 1,615 families residing in the city. The racial makeup of the city was 92.91% White, 2.47% African American, 0.27% Native American, 0.17% Asian, 0.07% Pacific Islander, 2.77% from other races, and 1.35% from two or more races. Hispanic or Latino of any race were 5.32% of the population.

There were 2,341 households, out of which 37.0% had children under the age of 18 living with them, 45.9% were married couples living together, 18.5% had a female householder with no husband present, and 31.0% were non-families. 26.4% of all households were made up of individuals, and 9.9% had someone living alone who was 65 years of age or older. The average household size was 2.56 and the average family size was 3.03.

In the city, the population was spread out, with 29.0% under the age of 18, 10.8% from 18 to 24, 30.4% from 25 to 44, 18.9% from 45 to 64, and 10.9% who were 65 years of age or older. The median age was 32 years. For every 100 females, there were 92.1 males. For every 100 females age 18 and over, there were 87.2 males.

The median income for a household in the city was $28,238, and the median income for a family was $35,592. Males had a median income of $27,240 versus $21,901 for females. The per capita income for the city was $13,892. About 15.8% of families and 19.2% of the population were below the poverty line, including 23.8% of those under age 18 and 17.8% of those age 65 or over.

Parks and recreation
The Sweet Shop, formerly Larry's Sweet Shop, was a small popular country store located in Pleasant Ridge subdivision. It was the main store for years serving the projects area, and at one time served soft ice cream thru a walk-up window. Larry's Sweet Shop was a popular hang out for many young people who grew up in the projects. Many of these youths grew up to be Pillars of the community. Larry's Sweet Shop was sold, and became Bobby's Sweet Shop until its closing.

The Charlestown Parks and Recreation Department strives to create lasting family memories and promote wellness for the residents of the City of Charlestown by providing family-friendly activities, events and recreation facilities. The Parks and Recreation Department operates the Arts and Enrichment Center, the Greenway Park Concession Stand and the city's community computer labs.

The Charlestown Parks and Recreation Department has hosted a variety of activities at Greenway Park since the completion of the concession stand in Greenway Park in the spring of 2009. Some of these activities include: Movies in the Park, Music in the Park, and a Back-to-School Bash. The Parks and Recreation Department also coordinates the city's annual celebration of Christmas, including Light Up Charlestown and the city's Christmas displays. Each year, the city converts the city square along Main Street into a Christmas village, with festive light displays and activities, earning Charlestown its reputation as the Christmas City of Southern Indiana.

The Parks and Recreation Department is supervised and directed by Marissa Knoebel.

The Parks Department also operates the Charlestown Family Activity Center. During Christmas in Charlestown, the Family Activities Park, located at 1000 Park Street across from Charlestown High School's Dutch Reis Field, is transformed into a Wonderland of Fun. Lights are omnipresent at the Park, including an animated light show just for the children. You can ice skate in the middle of a festive atmosphere, fill your bellies at the concession stand and board the train for an excursion through Charlestown's Festival of Lights. Try to imagine the Family Activities Park transformed into a lighted Christmas Wonderland with ice skating and a train waiting at the depot to be boarded for a trip through Charlestown's menagerie of lights. The Family Activities Park is open 6:00 p.m. through 9:00 p.m. Monday through Saturday, but is closed on December 24 and 25.

Common Council
The Common Council of the City of Charlestown meets for its regular business meeting on the first Monday of the month, beginning at 6:30 p.m. in the council chambers of City Hall, located at 304 Main Cross Street, Charlestown, Indiana. The Council is the legislative body of the government of the City of Charlestown, responsible for drafting and approving ordinances and resolutions that affect all Charlestown residents.

Council members

 Councilperson At Large - John T. Cox
 District 1 Councilperson - Bo Bertram 
 District 2 Councilperson - Ruthie Jackson 
 District 3 Councilperson - BJ Steele 
 District 4 Councilperson - Brian Hester

Education
Charlestown has numerous public schools, under the Greater Clark County Schools school district. Notable schools include: Pleasant Ridge Elementary School, Jonathan Jennings Elementary School, Charlestown Middle School, and Charlestown High School. Charlestown has a public library, a branch of the Charlestown-Clark County Public Library.

Arts and culture
Christmas in Charlestown is one of the biggest events in Southern Indiana in the winter seasons. There are Carriage Rides, a Christmas Parade, Breakfast with Santa, and Christmas lights. Charlestown has an animated light on the city square, lights throughout Greenway Park and all around the city. In 2013, Charlestown added a festive display at the new Family Activities Park, 1000 Park Street, across from Charlestown High School's Dutch Reis Football Field and train rides on the Charlestown Express.

Light Up Charlestown is the kick-off of the event in Charlestown. The day after Thanksgiving, festivities begin around 6:00 p.m. in Greenway park with an hour-long program leading up to the flipping of the switch to bring the lights on all over town.

In 2013, Christmas in Charlestown added Ice Skating to the many activities available during the holiday season. Beginning November 29 and lasting through December 31st the Skating Rink at the Charlestown Family Activities Park is converted into a winter wonderland for ice skaters. Charlestown also added the Christmas Express, which transports riders to different parts of Charlestown to enjoy the festivities.

Notable people

Mary Garrett Hay, suffragist
George Howk, Justice of the Indiana Supreme Court
Jonathan Jennings, first Indiana state Governor
Steve Hamilton, former NBA and MLB player
Days of the New, rock band
Travis Meeks, front-man of Days of the New
Michael Cleveland, an award-winning American bluegrass fiddle player
Jesse Vest, bass player, Days of the New, Tantric
 Zach Payne, member of the Indiana House of Representatives
 James Scott, Justice of the Indiana Supreme Court

References

External links

 City of Charlestown, Indiana website

 
Cities in Indiana
Louisville metropolitan area
Cities in Clark County, Indiana
Indiana populated places on the Ohio River
1808 establishments in Indiana Territory
Populated places established in 1808